Isabel Sambovo Fernandes, a.k.a. Belezura (born 5 June 1985) is a former team handball player from Angola. She was a member of the Angola women's national handball team, and participated at the 2011 World Women's Handball Championship in Brazil as well as at the 2004, 2008 and 2012 summer olympics.

Belezura is a 5 time African champion, having won such titles in 2004, 2006, 2008, 2010 and 2012.

Belezura was the top scorer at the 2005 Women's Junior World Handball Championship.

She last played for Angolan side Petro Atlético.

See also
 List of Angola international handball players

References

External links
 

1985 births
Living people
Angolan female handball players
Olympic handball players of Angola
Handball players at the 2004 Summer Olympics
Handball players at the 2008 Summer Olympics
Handball players at the 2012 Summer Olympics
African Games gold medalists for Angola
African Games medalists in handball
Competitors at the 2011 All-Africa Games